Swimming was contested at the 1974 Asian Games in Aryamehr Swimming Pool, Tehran, Iran from September 2 to September 7, 1974.

Medalists

Men

Women

Medal table

Results
Note: The following lists may not be complete.

Men

100 m freestyle
September 6

Heats

Final

200 m freestyle
September 2

Heats

Final

400 m freestyle
September 4

Heats

Final

1500 m freestyle

Heats
September 5

Final
September 7

100 m backstroke
September 6

Heats

Final

200 m backstroke
September 2

Heats

Final

100 m breaststroke
September 3

Heats

Final

200 m breaststroke
September 4

Heats

Final

100 m butterfly
September 5

Heats

Final

200 m butterfly
September 3

Heats

Final

200 m individual medley
September 7

Heats

Final

400 m individual medley
September 6

Heats

Final

4 × 100 m freestyle relay
September 7

4 × 200 m freestyle relay
September 3

4 × 100 m medley relay
September 5

Women

100 m freestyle
September 7

Heats

Final

200 m freestyle
September 2

Heats

Final

400 m freestyle
September 5

Heats

Final

100 m backstroke
September 3

Heats

Final

100 m breaststroke
September 2

Heats

Final

200 m breaststroke
September 4

Heats

Final

100 m butterfly
September 6

Heats

Final

200 m individual medley
September 3

Heats

Final

4 × 100 m freestyle relay
September 4

4 × 100 m medley relay
September 7

References 

 New Straits Times, September 3–8, 1974
 The Straits Times, September 3–8, 1974
 Sports 123: Asian Games

External links 
 Olympic Council of Asia

 
1974 Asian Games events
1974
Asian Games
1974 Asian Games